Milk fat globule-EGF factor 8 protein (Mfge8), also known as lactadherin, is a protein that in humans is encoded by the MFGE8 gene.

Species distribution 

Mfge8 is a secreted protein found in vertebrates, including mammals as well as birds.

Function 
MFGE8 may function as a cell adhesion protein to connect smooth muscle to elastic fibers in arteries. An amyloid fragment of MFGE8 known as medin accumulates in the aorta with aging. MFGE8 in the vasculature of adults can induce recovery from ischemia by facilitating angiogenesis. It has been suggested that antagonizing MFGE8-induced angiogenesis could be a way of fighting cancer.

MFGE8 contains a phosphatidylserine (PS) binding domain, as well as an arginine-glycine-aspartic acid motif, which enables the binding to integrins. MFGE8 binds PS, which is exposed on the surface of apoptotic cells. Opsonization of the apoptotic cells and binding to integrins on the surface of phagocytic cells, mediates the engulfment of the dead cell.

References

Further reading